This article lists the main modern pentathlon events and their results for 2010.

Youth Olympic Games
 August 14 – 26: Modern pentathlon at the 2010 Summer Youth Olympics
 Youth Individual winners:  Kim Dae-beom (m) /  Leydi Moya (f)
 Youth Mixed Team Relay winners:  Ilya Shugarov &  Anastasiya Spas

Other multi-sport events (Modern Pentathlon)
 July 6: 2010 World Military Modern Pentathlon Championships (stand alone event) in  Prague
 Individual winners:  David Svoboda (m) /  Jeļena Rubļevska (f)
 July 27 – 31: 2010 Central American and Caribbean Games in  Mayagüez
 Men's Individual winner:  Óscar Soto
 Team winners: 
 November 12 – 27: 2010 Asian Games in  Guangzhou
 Individual winners:  Cao Zhongrong (m) /  Miao Yihua (f)

World modern pentathlon events
 June 9 – 13: 2010 World Youth "A" Modern Pentathlon Championships in  Uppsala
 Youth Individual winners:  HAN Jiahao (m) /  Zsófia Földházi (f)
 Youth Men's Team Relay winners:  (PARK Sang-gu, Kim Dae-beom, & LEE Woo-jin)
 Youth Women's Team Relay winners:  (WANG Wei, ZHU Wenjing, & HUO Qi)
 Youth Mixed Team Relay winners:  (Gintarė Venčkauskaitė & Lukas Kontrimavicius)
 August 5 – 10: 2010 World Junior Modern Pentathlon Championships in  Székesfehérvár
 Junior Individual winners:  Bence Demeter (m) /  Sarolta Kovács (f)
 Junior Team Relay winners:  Florian Bou (m) /  Kate French (f)
 September 1 – 7: 2010 World Modern Pentathlon Championships in  Chengdu
 Individual winners:  Sergey Karyakin (m) /  Amélie Cazé (f)
 Team Relay winners:  Mihail Prokopenko (m) /  Polina Struchkova (f)
 Mixed winner:  Sylwia Gawlikowska

Continental modern pentathlon events
 May 11 – 16: 2010 European Youth "A" Modern Pentathlon Championships in  Varna
 Youth Individual winners:  Gergely Demeter (m) /  Gulnaz Gubaydullina (f)
 Youth Team Relay winners:  Valentin Prades (m) /  Zsófia Földházi (f)
 Youth Mixed winner:  Gintarė Venčkauskaitė
 May 24 – 30: 2010 European Junior Modern Pentathlon Championships in  Golegã
 Junior Individual winners:  Remigiusz Golis (m) /  Ekaterina Khuraskina (f)
 Junior Men's Team Relay winner:  Mikalai Hayanouski
 Junior Mixed Team Relay winner:  Ekaterina Khuraskina
 July 14 – 20: 2010 European Modern Pentathlon Championships in  Debrecen
 Individual winners:  David Svoboda (m) /  Amélie Cazé (f)
 Men's Team Relay winner:  Ádám Marosi
 August 26 – 30: 2010 South American Junior & Senior Modern Pentathlon Championships in  Quito
 Individual #1 winners:  Emmanuel Zapata (m) /  Priscila Oliveira (f)
 Individual #2 winners:  Esteban Bustos (m) /  Mariana Laporte (f)
 Men's Individual #3 winner:  Caio Silva
 September 9 – 13: 2010 European Youth "B" Modern Pentathlon Championships in  Varna
 Youth Individual winners:  Joe Choong (m) /  Alice Fitton (f)
 Youth Team Relay winners:  Sebastian Stasiak (m) /  Alice Fitton (f)
 Youth Mixed winner:  Diana Golyadkina
 November 18 – 20: 2010 Pan American Modern Pentathlon Championships in  Rio de Janeiro
 Individual winners:  William Brady (m) /  Yane Marques (f)
 Team Relay winners:  Jorge Inzunza (m) /  Kenia Campos (f)
 Mixed winner:  Pamela Zapata

2010 Modern Pentathlon World Cup
 March 4 – 7: MPWC #1 in  Playa del Carmen
 Individual winners:  David Svoboda (m) /  Lena Schöneborn (f)
 March 18 – 21: MPWC #2 in  Cairo
 Individual winners:  Edvinas Krungolcas (m) /  Evdokia Gretchichnikova (f)
 April 8 – 11: MPWC #3 in  Medway
 Individual winners:  Ádám Marosi (m) /  Amélie Cazé (f)
 May 6 – 9: MPWC #4 in  Budapest
 Individual winners:  Aleksander Lesun (m) /  Lena Schöneborn (f)
 Relay winner:  Jeļena Rubļevska
 June 3 – 6: MPWC #5 in  Berlin
 Individual winners:  Ilia Frolov (m) /  Lena Schöneborn (f)
 June 18 – 20: MPWC #6 (final) in  Moscow
 Individual winners:  Ádám Marosi (m) /  Lena Schöneborn (f)

References

External links
 Union Internationale de Pentathlon Moderne Website (UIPM)

 
Modern pentathlon
2010 in sports